The Order of Health Merit Jose Fernandez Madrid is an order granted by Colombia, established in 1950. The order is awarded for distinguished service in the medical field to the Colombian Armed Forces.

Criteria
The Order of Health Merit Jose Fernandez Madrid is primarily awarded to members of the Colombian Military Medical Corps for acts of heroism, excellence in military spirit and discipline, performance in instruction in the development of the tasks of the General Staff, scientific research for the benefit of the Colombian Armed Forces and distinguished service. Members of the other branches of the armed forces may be awarded this order, as well as foreign civilian and military personnel.

Grades
The Order of Health Merit Jose Fernandez Madrid is awarded in the following grades:
 Grand Cross (Gran Cruz)
 Grand Officer (Gran Oficial)
 Commander (Comendador)
 Officer (Oficial)
 Knight (Caballero)
 Companion (Compañero)

Notable recipients

 C. Walton Lillehei

References

Orders, decorations, and medals of Colombia